Aleph Farms is a cultivated meat company. The company was co-founded in 2017 with the Israeli food-tech incubator “The Kitchen” of Strauss Group Ltd., and with Prof. Shulamit Levenberg of the Faculty of Biomedical Engineering at Technion – Israel Institute of Technology and is headquartered in Rehovot, Israel.

History 
In December 2018, Aleph Farms released its prototype, a steak grown directly from cow cells. In February 2021, Aleph Farms unveiled the world's first cell-based ribeye steak, produced through 3D bioprinting.

In May 2019, the company announced a US$12M funding round led by Vis Vires New Protein. Other investors were Cargill and M-Industry (Industrial Group of Migros). In July 2021, the company received $105 million in a Series B investment round. The round was led by L Catterton's Growth Fund and DisruptAD, a sovereign fund based in Abu Dhabi. Other participants include Temasek, Skyviews Life Science and an international consortium of food giants Thai Union, BRF, and CJ CheilJedang. Additional participants include existing investors like Strauss Group, Cargill, Vis Vlires New Protein, Peregrine Ventures and CPT Capital.

In September 2021, actor and environmentalist Leonardo DiCaprio announced that he had funded Mosa Meat and Aleph Farms for undisclosed amounts of money, stating: 'One of the most impactful ways to combat the climate crisis is to transform our food system. Mosa Meat and Aleph Farms offer new ways to satisfy the world's demand for beef, while solving some of the most pressing issues of current industrial beef production.'

Cost and scale 

Aleph Farms aims to reach price parity with conventional meat within five years from its initial market launch.

The company is forming partnerships across its entire value chain, as part of its go to market strategy: from the upstream to bring down the costs and increase efficiency of manufacturing, to the downstream to leverage existing local and industrial capabilities. This ecosystem allows it to reach cost reduction targets and support rapid increase in production scale.

Aleph Farms has signed Memorandum of Understanding (MoU) with global food and meat companies to bring cultivated meat to local markets. The agreements were signed with BRF in Brazil, Mitsubishi Corporation in Japan, Thai Union in Thailand and CJ CheilJedang in South Korea.

The company’s open supply chain solution with WACKER, a supplier of leading protein production technologies, is focused on co-development of streamlined production processes for essential growth medium proteins that serve as a replacement for proteins found in fetal bovine serum (FBS).

Growth medium proteins are essential components naturally found in animals and represent one of the most prohibitive expenses in scaling cultivated meat. These proteins help cells grow and mature into muscle, fat and collagen-producing cells and are imperative for supporting cellular activity

In February 2022, Aleph Farms reportedly moved into a 65,000-sq-ft facility to increase its operations sixfold. The move allowed the company to launch a pilot production facility and build an R&D center. The company expects for its pilot facility to become fully operational by summer of 2022,, ahead of our initial market launch by 2023 in the Middle East and Asia, pending regulatory approvals for its cultivated beef steak.

The technology 
The cellular agriculture technique used by Aleph Farms for their cultured meat is based on a process naturally occurring in cows to regrow and build muscle tissue.

The company isolates the cells responsible for this process and grows them in bioreactors, in the same conditions as inside the cow, to form muscle tissue typical to steaks. To mimic the natural environment and the 3D structure, cultivated meat companies, and Aleph Farms in particular, use a scaffold which is required to achieve the appropriate characteristics that allow cell adhesion and subsequent proliferation and tissue development. The extent to which the biology of the muscle is replicated, determines the complexity of the tissue engineering process that must be utilised. Like-for-like pieces of muscle (e.g. steak) require a system containing multiple cell types growing in an organised manner, on a structure that is similar to the extracellular matrix, composed mainly by collagen.

The company developed a technique that enables different cell types to grow together. In order to grow the meat without the need for raising livestock, a small amount of cells is extracted from an animal through a small sample and is placed afterward in a nutrient-rich broth. Within a cultivator designed to mimic the internal environment of the animal’s body, the cells then multiply, differentiate, and form the same tissue as inside the animal's body. After the steak in the cultivator has grown to the desired size and characteristics, the steak is harvested and ready for cooking.

To produce thick vascularized tissues, Aleph Farms developed a technology based on 3D Bioprinting. It involves the printing of actual living cells that are then incubated to grow, differentiate, and interact, in order to acquire the texture and qualities of a real steak. A proprietary system, similar to the vascularization that occurs naturally in tissues, enables the perfusion of nutrients across the thicker tissue and grants the steak with the similar shape and structure of its native form as found in livestock before and during cooking. This technology enables Aleph Farms to produce thicker and fattier steaks.

In March 2022, Aleph Farms shared its strategy to replace the whole cow as a supplement to sustainable cattle farming. In addition to cultivated meat, it is expanding its product line to include cell-cultured collagen. The cultivated collagen will be produced from the cells of living cows, eliminating the need to slaughter animals during the production. 
Cultivated collagen is another representation of Aleph’s technological capability to produce quality products with similar attributes of slaughter-based products from animals. These attributes have not been matched by plant-based alternatives to animal products, or by fermentation-based products before. It also expands the capabilities of cell-culture technology to eventually replace the entire cow.
Aleph Farms leverages key components from the production method it has developed for steaks, including the bovine cell sources and animal component-free growth medium, to produce several nature-identical collagen types directly from cow cells. Its cultivated collagen includes the entire extracellular matrix (ECM) which comprises a variety of fibre-forming proteins and it represents the complete matrix of skin, bones, and joints. Collagen is the most abundant protein in the ECM and is well recognized for its benefits.
The production platforms for its our steaks and its our collagen share largely similar inputs and equipment, while presenting operational and cost-reduction synergies.

Sustainability
A recent study by CE Delft – the first ever to be based on data from cultivated meat companies – found that cultivated beef has the potential to reduce greenhouse gas emissions by 92%, land use by 95%, and water use by 78% compared to intensive livestock farming.

In April 2020, Aleph Farms became the first cultivated meat company to announce net zero carbon goals, which are to reach net zero carbon within its operations by 2025, and throughout its supply chain by 2030. In November 2021, it shared its strategy for achieving these goals along with key partnerships it has established to support its efforts. 
.

The company signed a Memorandum of Understanding (MoU) with ENGIE Impact, the sustainability consulting arm of ENGIE, one of the world’s leading energy providers. Engie will ensure that Aleph’s operations are net zero compatible from the get-go, integrating energy efficiency, circularity in energy, as well as renewable energy and other strategic investments across its production line and supply chain.

Its commitment to net zero carbon is being supported by additional partnerships such as with CE Delft to analyse the life cycle impacts of its our production line and supply chain. By identifying hotspots, CE Delft will optimise its overall ecological footprint including carbon, water, waste and more. Aleph Farms also partnered with Ripe.io to improve the traceability in its supply chain and report on carbon emissions of all materials used during its production process. 

.

In January 2022, Aleph Farms announced its partnership with Federation University Australia and Professor Harpinder Sandhu, an Ecological Economist with expertise in food and farming systems. The partnership focuses on examining the role of cultivated meat in a Just Transition of the livestock farming industry. Together, the entities will conduct a comparative study focused on the US, Europe and the Global South, examining different types of livestock systems (intensive and extensive) and exploring the impacts and potential benefits cultivated meat could bring to the table. Based on the findings, they will develop tailored business models that include synergies between cultivated meat and traditional livestock farming systems in each of these regions.

Space Program
In September 2019, Aleph Farms conducted the world’s first experiment of meat cultivation aboard the International Space Station. It worked with 3D Bioprinting Solutions to produce a small-scale muscle tissue, the building block of its cultivated steak. The focus of this experiment was on establishing the cell-cell contacts, the structure, and the texture of a muscle tissue.

In October 2020, Aleph Farms announced the launch of its space program, Aleph Zero. The focus of the program is on developing a technological platform for the production of cultivated beef steaks in a process that consumes a significantly smaller portion of the resources needed to raise an entire animal for meat. Understanding these processes in such an extreme environment, will advance Aleph's ability to develop a complete process of cultivated meat production for long-term space missions and build an efficient production process that reduces the environmental footprint on Earth.

In April 2022, Aleph Farms will carry out its second experiment in space as part of the Rakia Mission and Ax-1. Its experiment will make use of a special microfluidic device, developed by SpacePharma, that enables cow cells to grow and mature into cells that build muscle tissue, the cultivated steak, under microgravity conditions.

References

External links 
 Official website

Business incubators
Cellular agriculture
Food and drink companies established in 2017
Food and drink companies of Israel
Food technology organizations